This is a list of the members of the 5th Seanad Éireann, the upper house of the Oireachtas (legislature) of Ireland. These Senators were elected or appointed in 1944, after the 1944 general election and served until the close of poll for the 6th Seanad in 1948.

Composition of the 5th Seanad
There are a total of 60 seats in the Seanad. 43 Senators are elected by the Vocational panels, 6 elected by the Universities and 11 are nominated by the Taoiseach.

The following table shows the composition by party when the 5th Seanad first met on 18 August 1944.

List of senators

Changes

See also
Members of the 12th Dáil
Government of the 12th Dáil

References

External links

 
05